Phalaenopsis inscriptiosinensis is a species of orchid endemic to central Sumatra.

Description
The plants are short-stemmed epiphytes with 3-5, elliptic-oblong, 8-16 cm long and 4-8 cm wide leaves. The 3.5 cm wide, white or pale yellow flowers bear transverse band of brown, which are reflected in the specific epithet inscriptiosinensis, as they are thought to resemble inscription on the petals and sepals. They are produced on axillary, decurved, 2-5 flowered racemes.

Taxonomy
This species is placed within the section Zebrinae, however its position is somewhat unclear. It could be separated from other species of this section on the basis of restriction site polymorphisms.

Conservation
This species is protected unter the CITES appendix II regulations of international trade.

Images

References

inscriptiosinensis
Orchids of Indonesia
Orchids of Sumatra